Inna Vernikov (born August 30, 1984) is an American attorney and politician serving as a member of the New York City Council for the 48th District. The Minority Whip of the City Council, her district includes the neighborhoods of Brighton Beach, West Brighton Beach, Manhattan Beach, Gravesend, and parts of  Midwood and Sheepshead Bay in Brooklyn. Formerly a Democrat, Vernikov is a member of the Republican Party.

Early life and education
Vernikov was born in Chernivtsi in Ukrainian SSR, Soviet Union (now southwestern Ukraine), to Jewish parents. She attended ORT Specialized School #41, a Ukrainian Jewish day school. At age 12, she immigrated with her family to the United States. She received a BA from Baruch College and a JD from Florida Coastal School of Law.

Career
Vernikov served as an aide to New York State Assemblymember Dov Hikind. Prior to running for City Council, Vernikov was an immigration and divorce attorney.

New York City Council

Campaign
Previously a registered Democrat, Vernikov switched parties and became a Republican to run for office and after seeing the rise in antisemitism and what she sees as socialism in New York City. She is a supporter of Donald Trump. While campaigning, she said “Jews coming from the former Soviet Union are very familiar with communism and socialism, and many of us feel strongly that what today’s Democratic Party is promoting is exactly what we ran from—a place where speech was censored, where we were not allowed to practice religion, where we didn’t have freedom or economic opportunity.”

Vernikov received the support of the district's former councilman Democrat Chaim Deutsch (who had been expelled from the council after pleading guilty to tax fraud), and was endorsed by Donald Trump Jr. (who made a robocall on her behalf). She was elected to the City Council after defeating the Democratic nominee Steve Saperstein. She became one of five Republicans in the 51-member council, and the first Republican to represent a portion of Brooklyn in the New York City Council since Marty Golden in 2002.

Council member
As a councilwoman, Vernikov organized a rally against COVID-19 vaccine mandates in New York City outside Gracie Mansion in Manhattan. She had also organized a march against antisemitism after two Jewish teenagers were assaulted for wearing a hoodie with the logo of the Israel Defense Forces. After the faculty at City University of New York Law School passed a resolution supporting Boycott, Divestment and Sanctions against Israel, Vernikov announced she would pull $50,000 in funding for the law school and redirect it towards Legal Services NYC.

She voted against expanding New York’s speed camera program, which issues speeding tickets when a driver exceeds the posted speed limit by 11 or more miles per hour in a school zone. In September 2022, it was reported that Vernikov had been caught on camera for repeatedly and recklessly speeding through school zones. She had received 23 camera-issued tickets since mid-2020. She had also received 31 other non-moving violations. 

In December 2022, Vernikov called for the national Republican party leadership to condemn Trump for hosting Kanye West and Nick Fuentes at his residence, where West supposedly made repeated antisemitic views.

References

American Orthodox Jews
American people of Ukrainian-Jewish descent
American Zionists
Florida Coastal School of Law alumni
Living people
Politicians from Brooklyn
New York (state) Democrats
New York (state) Republicans
1984 births
Women New York City Council members
21st-century American women politicians